Edoardo Scrosta (born 11 July 1992) is an Italian footballer player who plays as a defender for United Riccione.

Club career
He made his Serie C debut for Virtus Lanciano on 19 February 2012 in a game against Frosinone.

On 10 August 2018, he joined Serie C club Fermana.

On 6 August 2022, Scrosta moved to United Riccione in Serie D.

References

External links
 
 

1992 births
People from Fano
Sportspeople from the Province of Pesaro and Urbino
Footballers from Marche
Living people
Italian footballers
Association football defenders
Serie B players
Serie C players
Serie D players
Lega Pro Seconda Divisione players
Alma Juventus Fano 1906 players
S.S. Virtus Lanciano 1924 players
Bassano Virtus 55 S.T. players
Mantova 1911 players
U.C. AlbinoLeffe players
Fermana F.C. players
A.S.D. Riccione 1929 players